Presidential and vice-presidential elections were held in South Korea on 15 March 1960. Shortly after winning reelection to a second term in the 1952 presidential election, Rhee had the legislature pass a constitutional amendment exempting himself from the two-term limit, allowing himself to run for and win a third term in 1956 and in March 1960.

After the death of Democratic Party opponent Cho Pyong-ok, Rhee was left as the only candidate, and was re-elected unopposed. Voter turnout was 97.0%. With the lack of a meaningful contest in the presidential race, popular focus shifted to the vice-presidential contest where Rhee's Liberal Party candidate Lee Ki-bung competed against Chang Myon. The elections were heavily rigged in Lee's favor, and widespread allegations of corruption and manipulation of the results sparked protests which spiralled into the April Revolution, causing the annulment of the election, the resignation and exile of Rhee, and the collapse of the First Republic.

Results

President
Popular hopes of unseating Rhee were frustrated by the death of his opponent Cho Pyong-ok several weeks before the election, leaving Rhee to be elected without opposition.

The constitution stated, if there was only one candidate, they were required to receive at least 30% of the total votes cast in order to be elected, including blank and invalid votes. As the only candidate, Rhee received 88.7% of all votes cast. Dissent to the authoritarian president was more apparent in the urban areas than the rest of the country. In Seoul, nearly a third of the votes were invalid or blank, while in the vice presidential election held simultaneously, only 2.9% of the ballots were invalidated.

By region

Vice-President
With no competition for Rhee in the presidential elections of 1960 after the death of his opponent, the simultaneous vice-presidential elections became the main focus of attention. Opposition to Rhee was concentrated around the incumbent Democratic Party candidate, Chang Myon, who had been elected in 1956. Official results after the election showed a large victory for the Liberal candidate, Lee Ki Poong, with a margin of almost 80% to Chang's 17.5%, entirely against popular expectations, and it was obvious that the results had been extensively manipulated: Han goes so far as to say that "the election results were completely fabricated by police headquarters and the ministry of internal affairs".

The Democratic Party rejected the result and on the same day, protests began in Masan against the fabrication of the election results. The discovery of the mutilated body of a sixteen-year-old boy who had participated in these protests in early April caused a wave of further protest, and Rhee's obdurate attitude led to the intensification of unrest into the April Revolution, though Rhee forced Lee to withdraw from active politics. The results of the elections were nullified after the Revolution's triumph later in the year, though Chang himself resigned on April 23.

By region

References

1960 elections in South Korea
1960 1
1960 1
Electoral fraud in South Korea
Syngman Rhee
1960